Grötzsch or Groetzsch may refer to:

Herbert Grötzsch, German mathematician
Grötzsch, German name for Grodziszcze, Żary County, a village in Poland

See also
Grötzsch graph
Grötzsch's theorem